This is a list of science fiction comedy films.

References

See also
 Lists of science fiction films
 Lists of comedy films
 List of science fiction horror films
 List of science fiction action films

Science Fiction
Lists of films by genre
Science fiction lists